Werner Geeser (16 February 1948 – 9 September 2011) was a Swiss cross-country skier. He competed in the Men's 30 kilometres and 50 kilometres events at the 1972 Winter Olympics.

See also
 Cross-country skiing at the 1972 Winter Olympics

References

External links
 

1948 births
2011 deaths
People from Plessur District
Cross-country skiers at the 1972 Winter Olympics
Swiss male cross-country skiers
Olympic cross-country skiers of Switzerland
Sportspeople from Graubünden